Parsons USD 503 is a public unified school district headquartered in Parsons, Kansas, United States.  The district includes the community of Parsons and nearby rural areas.

Schools
The school district operates the following schools:
 Parsons High School
 Parsons Middle School
 Garfield Elementary School
 Guthridge Elementary School
 Lincoln Elementary School

See also
 Kansas State Department of Education
 Kansas State High School Activities Association
 List of high schools in Kansas
 List of unified school districts in Kansas

References

External links
 

School districts in Kansas